The Chinese High School was founded in 1940, located in Batu Pahat, Johor, Malaysia, with 2850 students as of January 2011. It was formerly known as the Overseas Chinese School.

See also
 Chinese Independent High School
 Education in Malaysia

External links
 Official website of Chinese High School (Batu Pahat)
 MOODLE Chinese High School (Batu Pahat)
 A forum that talks about Chinese High School
 郭成焕老师-峇株吧辖华仁中学古筝社-Chinese-High-School-Batu-Pahat-GuZheng-Club

Schools in Johor
Secondary schools in Malaysia
1940 establishments in British Malaya
Educational institutions established in 1940
Chinese-language schools in Malaysia